Istituto Messedaglia, officially called "Liceo Scientifico Angelo Messedaglia", is one of the oldest schools in Verona, Veneto, North Italy. 
It is a scientific school, with students who focus on the scientific subjects and can choose different paths: traditional, PNI (Piano Nazionale Informatico, which is Information Technology) or languages.

External links
Official School Website 

Schools in Veneto
Buildings and structures in Verona
Education in Verona